Enchelyurus flavipes, the yellowfin blenny, is a species of combtooth blenny from the western Pacific Ocean. It occasionally makes its way into the aquarium trade.

References

flavipes
Fish described in 1868
Taxa named by Wilhelm Peters